Fontaine-le-Dun is a commune in the Seine-Maritime department in the Normandy region in northern France.

Geography

Heraldry

Population

Places of interest
 The eleventh-century church of Notre-Dame
 A sixteenth-century stone cross
 A manorhouse dating from the seventeenth century

Notable people
Pierre Giffard, journalist, was born here in 1853.

See also
Communes of the Seine-Maritime department

References

External links

An unofficial website 

Communes of Seine-Maritime